Faith in Space is an album by the singer/songwriter Lida Husik. It was released in 1998 through Alias Records.

Critical reception
Wired wrote that the album's "cabaret dance pop marks the same territory as Madonna's Ray of Light, but with a less chilly approach and none of the self-righteous armchair spirituality." The Washington Post called the album "a little spacey," writing that "its mixture of beats and burbles sounds less like a trip to another galaxy than like a walk in the woods near a rave."

Track listing

Personnel
Beaumont Hannant – drum machine, keyboards, sampler
Lida Husik – vocals, guitar, bass guitar, keyboards
Mandy Parnell – mastering

References

External links 
 

1998 albums
Lida Husik albums